Adrenalina is Finley's second studio album. It was released on June 15, 2007 by EMI.

They have already been released three singles from this CD: Adrenalina, Domani and Questo sono io. Niente da perdere was played for the first time as anticipating the album Adrenalina at the MTV TRL Awards 2007, which took place in Milan, on April 14, in Piazza Duomo, followed by a medley of Fumo e cenere, Tutto è possibile and Diventerai una star. During the Tour On TRL, in Bari and in Roma they played the song Domani, the second single from the album. On Friday 28 September 2007 for the first time it was sent their second exclusive video of Domani in the television broadcast TRL. In addition, MTV choose Finley with their video of Domani to open from 1 October 2007 Pulse, a new digital channel. On 1 December 2007 they performed live to the Kids' Choice Awards their third single, Questo sono io.

Track listing

Personnel 

 Marco Pedretti – lead vocals
 Carmine Ruggiero – guitars, vocals
 Stefano Mantegazza – bass, vocals
 Danilo Calvio – drums, vocals

2007 albums
Finley (band) albums